Ashley Margolis (born 31 October 1993) is an English actor. He is best known for his role as Ricky Campbell in the British Channel 4 soap opera Hollyoaks, in which he appeared regularly between 2009 and 2012. He has recently married Kelly Clare in August 2022.

Career
His acting career began in 2002 with his role as Chip in Beauty and the Beast in the Disney National Tour, 2002. He trained with David Johnson in Manchester, where he developed his improvisational skills and appeared in various TV commercials. In 2009 he was cast as Ricky Campbell in the Channel 4 soap opera Hollyoaks. He left his role in March 2012. In 2013, he appeared as Josh in the BBC Three sitcom Some Girls. In 2014, he appeared as Todd Magellen in Doctors for BBC One. In 2016, he appeared in the BBC TV series Father Brown as Jackie. He has also voiced characters in various video games and audio books. In September 2021, he portrayed the role of Nick Meadows in an episode of Doctors.

Theatre Credits

2022 Liam in Bad Jews, The Arts Theatre
2022 Telephone Guy in The Band’s Visit, Donmar Warehouse

Filmography

References

External links

 

1993 births
People from Bury, Greater Manchester
Male actors from Greater Manchester
English Jews
English male child actors
English male soap opera actors
Living people